Events in the year 2018 in Jamaica.

Incumbents
 Monarch: Elizabeth II
 Governor-General: Patrick Allen
 Prime Minister: Andrew Holness
 Chief Justice: Zaila McCalla

Events

Sports
9 to 25 February – Jamaica participated at the 2018 Winter Olympics in PyeongChang, South Korea, with 3 competitors in 2 sports, bobsleigh and skeleton

Deaths

5 March – Dorothy Henriques-Wells, 92, artist

15 March – Gene Pearson, 71, ceramic artist.

7 July – Garry Lowe, musician (b. 1976).

31 July – Irvin Jarrett, reggae percussionist (Inner Circle, Third World).

References

 
2010s in Jamaica
Years of the 21st century in Jamaica
Jamaica
Jamaica